Ambrogio Soldani (1733-1815) was an Italian Camaldolese monk who is known for his works relating the shell fossils found in the mountains of Tuscany. Some of his work could now be viewed as the intersection of geology, zoology and paleontology. He also published observations about astronomy.

He was born in Prato Vecchio, and entered the Camaldolese order in the Monastery degli Angeli in Florence as a young man (1732), yet he took an interest in mathematics. He transferred to the Monastery of San Michele di Pisa. He was raised to chancellor of the order and transferred to a monastery in Siena. There he began examining under a microscope the fossils in Tuscan chalk deposits, near Siena and Volterra. He was appointed professor of Mathematics at the University of Siena, and in that town became the secretary of the Accademia dei Fisiocritici, consisting of individuals with interest in natural sciences. In 1783, he traveled through the Romagna region gathering more samples and exploring thermal springs. On 16 June 1794, there was an aerolite or meteor shower in Siena, and he published his observations and about meteor samples. Upon his death, he gifted his fossil collections to the state.

Among his works were:
Saggio orittografico
Osservazione sui terreni nautilici ed ammonitici della Toscana: Observations about Tuscan lands with ammonites and nautiloids"; (1780, Siena)
Testaceographia e Zoophytographie parva et microscopica (1789-1798)

References

1733 births
1815 deaths
Italian naturalists
Italian paleontologists
Academic staff of the University of Siena
18th-century Italian geologists
18th-century Italian zoologists
People from Tuscany